Patrik Poór (born 15 November 1993) is a Hungarian football player who plays for MTK Budapest.

Club career
On 29 July 2022, Poór returned to MTK Budapest.

Club statistics

Updated to games played as of 15 May 2022.

References

External links
 Profile at HLSZ 
 Profile at MLSZ 
 

1993 births
Sportspeople from Győr
Living people
Hungarian footballers
Hungary youth international footballers
Hungary under-21 international footballers
Hungary international footballers
Association football defenders
MTK Budapest FC players
Puskás Akadémia FC players
Paksi FC players
Debreceni VSC players
Nemzeti Bajnokság I players
Nemzeti Bajnokság II players
Hungarian expatriate footballers
Expatriate footballers in England
Hungarian expatriate sportspeople in England